Francis Edward Sweeney Sr. (January 24, 1934 – April 10, 2011) was an American politician and jurist of the Ohio Democratic party. He served as a justice of the Ohio Supreme Court from 1993 to 2004.
While on the court, he formed a majority coalition with fellow Democrat Alice Robie Resnick and Republicans Paul Pfeifer and Andrew Douglas.

He earned his Juris Doctor from the Cleveland State University College of Law in 1963.

Sweeney, played defensive tackle for Xavier as well as in the Canadian Football League. His grandson Jake Ryan was a linebacker in the NFL, while two of his other grandsons (Connor (wide receiver) and Zack (linebacker) Ryan) played college football at Ball State.

References

External links
 Biography at the Supreme Court of Ohio

Just Sports Stats

Justices of the Ohio Supreme Court
Cleveland–Marshall College of Law alumni
Ohio Democrats
Lawyers from Cleveland
Saint Ignatius High School (Cleveland) alumni
1934 births
2011 deaths
Ohio Republicans
American football guards
Canadian football guards
American players of Canadian football
Xavier Musketeers football players
Ottawa Rough Riders players
Players of American football from Ohio
20th-century American judges
20th-century American lawyers